The 10th National Basketball Association All-Star Game was played on January 22, 1960, in Philadelphia.  The coaches were Red Auerbach for the East, and Ed Macauley for the West.

Eastern Conference

Western Conference

Score by Periods
 

Halftime— East, 58-51
Third Quarter— East, 91-81
Officials: Arnie Heft and Sid Borgia
Attendance: 10,421.

References

https://web.archive.org/web/20080916093111/http://www.sportingnews.com/archives/almanac/nba/allstargame.html

National Basketball Association All-Star Game
All-Star Game
Sports competitions in Philadelphia
1960s in Philadelphia
January 1960 sports events in the United States
1960 in sports in Pennsylvania